is a passenger railway station  located in the city of Minamiashigara, Kanagawa Prefecture, Japan, operated by the Izuhakone Railway.

Lines
Wadagahara Station is served by the  Daiyūzan Line, and is located 8.2 kilometers from the line’s terminus at Odawara Station.

Station layout
The station consists of a single island platform connected to a concrete four-story station building. The upper three stories of the station building are apartments. The station has a staffed service window.

Platforms

Adjacent stations

History
Wadagahara Station was officially opened on October 15, 1925. The new station building was completed in March 1992.

Passenger statistics
In fiscal 2019, the station was used by an average of 1,552 passengers daily (boarding passengers only).

The passenger figures (boarding passengers only) for previous years are as shown below.

Bus services
 Hakone Tozan Bus
 for Odakyu Kaisei Station
 for Sekimoto (Daiyuzan Station)

Surrounding area
The station has a square with a bus terminal. Public facilities are close to the Wadagahara Station Square Post Office and the Minamiashigara City Sports Center. Many factories of Fujifilm and related companies are located to the southwest and northeast of the station, which is closer to the main gate than the adjacent Fujifilm-mae station.

See also
List of railway stations in Japan

References

External links

Izuhakone Railway home page 

Railway stations in Japan opened in 1925
Izuhakone Daiyuzan Line
Railway stations in Kanagawa Prefecture
Minamiashigara, Kanagawa